Orobophana pacifica is a species of land snail of the Helicinidae family.

References

Helicinidae